Mandia is a developed village in the Barpeta district of Assam, India. It is located along the Bhelengi River. Nearby villages include Satra Kanara, Bhatkuchi, Bamun Dongra, Sonapur Rubhi, Sitoli, Govindupur and Gajia. It is located 8 km south of district headquarter Barpeta and headquarter of the Mandia Development Block. The main market is Mandia Bazaar, where a weekly Haat bazaar takes place on Monday.

Demographics 
The village comes under of Baghbar LAC (126), with a majority of inhabitants belonging to East Bengal-rooted Muslim. According to the 2011 census, the total 3000 population is fairly evenly split between males and females. Mandia has a slightly lower literacy rate of 69% compared to Assam's 72%, and within the village the male population has a higher rate of literacy than the female population. Hindu Assamese,Hindu Bengali are also inhabitant in Mandia.

Education 
10+ lower primary schools are situated in Mandia. Mandia Higher Secondary School and Mandia Anchalik College are two institutions of higher education. Two private school operate there, one Assamese Medium Mandia Jatiya Bidyala and one English medium. One Model school was established by State government. A private Islamic school is there.

Transport 
The Barpeta Mandia Road connects the village with district. The people of Mandia faces traffic problems because of narrow bridge over the Bhelengi river.Public transport buses and mini buses are available which connects the district and the city Guwahati.

References

Villages in Barpeta district